Herbert Forsyth (8 July 1896 – 3 May 1969) was a New Zealand cricketer. He played in two first-class matches for Canterbury in 1917/18.

See also
 List of Canterbury representative cricketers

References

External links
 

1896 births
1969 deaths
New Zealand cricketers
Canterbury cricketers
Cricketers from Christchurch